Zsolt Pölöskei (born 19 February 1991) is a retired Hungarian football player.

Club statistics

Updated to games played as of 26 July 2018.

References

External links
Profile at HLSZ 
Profile at MLSZ 

1991 births
Living people
Footballers from Budapest
Hungarian footballers
Association football midfielders
MTK Budapest FC players
Fehérvár FC players
Budapest Honvéd FC players
Nemzeti Bajnokság I players
Hungarian expatriate footballers
Expatriate footballers in England
Hungarian expatriate sportspeople in England